Stuart Samuel Baird (13 May 1930 – 21 April 2010) was a Scottish football player and manager.

Career

During his playing career he played for Clyde, Preston North End, Rangers, Hibernian, Third Lanark and Stirling Albion. He won three Scottish league titles (1956, 1957 and 1959) and one Scottish Cup (1960) with Rangers.

Baird won the Division Two title in 1951–52 with Clyde. Baird scored five times for Rangers as they reached the 1959–60 European Cup semi finals and was influential for Hibernian on their run to the 1960–61 Inter-Cities Fairs Cup semi finals. Preston paid £12,000 for his signature and Rangers paid £10,000 for his services. Hibs then forked out £5,000 for him.

International career 

He earned seven international caps for Scotland from 1956 to 1958. He scored on his debut against Yugoslavia, and also in his last match, a 2–1 defeat by France in the 1958 FIFA World Cup. The latter goal was the first time a Rangers player scored in a World Cup Finals match. He remains the only Rangers player to do so.

Additionally, Baird represented the Scottish League XI on five occasions. He scored in his last appearance against the Football League XI at Ibrox in 1958.

He earned earlier representative honours with Clyde. In 1953 against the British Army, Baird converted a penalty for Scotland XI in 2–2 draw at Goodison Park. As preparation for the FIFA World Cup, Baird played for a Scotland XI in a couple of trial matches in 1958.

Manager 

As Stirling Albion manager, Baird led the team to promotion to Division One winning the Division Two title in 1964–65.

His Albion team became the first British and first professional team to tour Japan in 1966. The results of the two-match tour were 3–1 against a Japanese All Stars XI and 4–2 against the Japan national team.

He was later sacked in 1968 because the club were heading for relegation back to Division Two.

Personal life 

Baird died on the morning of 21 April 2010.

Honours

Player 

Clyde
 Scottish Division Two: 1951–52
 Supplementary Cup: 1951–52
 Glasgow Cup: 1951–52 
 Runner-up: 1949–50
 Glasgow Charity Cup: 1951–52

Rangers
 Scottish Division One: 1955–56, 1956–57, 1958–59 
 Scottish Cup: 1959–60
 Scottish League Cup:
 Runner-up: 1957–58
 Glasgow Cup: 1956–57, 1957–58, 1959–60

Hibernian
 East of Scotland Shield: 1960–61

Third Lanark
 Glasgow Cup: 1962–63

Manager 

Stirling Albion
 Scottish Division Two: 1964–65

References

External links

Stirling Albion profile

1930 births
2010 deaths
People from Denny, Falkirk
Association football utility players
Scottish footballers
Scotland international footballers
1958 FIFA World Cup players
Rutherglen Glencairn F.C. players
Clyde F.C. players
Hibernian F.C. players
Preston North End F.C. players
Rangers F.C. players
Stirling Albion F.C. players
Third Lanark A.C. players
Scottish Football League players
English Football League players
Scottish football managers
Stirling Albion F.C. managers
Scottish Football League representative players
Footballers from Falkirk (council area)
Scottish Football League managers
Association football inside forwards
Association football wing halves